The National Quality Framework (NQF) is part of the Australian Government’s agenda for early childhood education and child care focused on providing Australian families with high-quality, accessible and affordable integrated early childhood education and child care. The NQF aims to raise quality and drive continuous improvement and consistency in education and care services through:
 a national legislative framework
 a National Quality Standard
 a national quality rating and assessment process
 a new national body called the Australian Children’s Education & Care Quality Authority.
The National Quality Framework took effect on 1 January 2012 with key requirements being phased in over time. Requirements such as qualification, educator-to-child ratios and other key staffing arrangements will be phased in between 2012 and 2020.

See also
 Early Childhood Australia, the peak early childhood advocacy organisation in Australia

References

External links
Department of Education, Employment and Workplace Relations
Department of Education, Employment and Workplace Relations Agenda
Australian Children's Education and Care Quality Authority

Education in Australia